Ecsenius dentex is a species of combtooth blenny in the genus Ecsenius. It is found in the western Indian ocean, and is endemic to the gulfs of Aqaba, Suez, and the northwestern Red Sea. It can reach a maximum length of 4.8 centimetres. The blenny feeds primarily off of benthic algae and weeds.

References

External links
 

dentex
Fish described in 1988
Taxa named by Victor G. Springer